Fred Thomas (born June 27, 1958) is an American politician. He served in the Montana Senate and was Majority Leader from 2017 to 2021.

Biography
Thomas was born on June 27, 1958, in Hamilton, Montana. His grandfather, Fred A. Thomas, was a member of the Montana House of Representatives. In 2009, Thomas became Vice President of the National Association of Professional Insurance Agents.

Political career
Thomas was a member of the House of Representatives from 1985 to 1992. He became a member of the Senate in 1997 and served as the Senate Majority Leader from 2000 to 2004. Thomas returned to the Senate in 2012 and was elected Senate Majority Leader in 2017.

References

|-

1958 births
21st-century American politicians
Living people
Republican Party members of the Montana House of Representatives
Republican Party Montana state senators
Montana State University alumni
People from Hamilton, Montana